Qapanlı is a village and municipality in the Tartar District of Azerbaijan.

Populated places in Tartar District